The 2022 Alsco Uniforms 300 was the third stock car race of the 2022 NASCAR Xfinity Series and the 26th iteration of the event. The race was held on Saturday, March 5, 2022, in North Las Vegas, Nevada at Las Vegas Motor Speedway, a 1.5 miles (2.4 km) permanent D-shaped oval racetrack. The race was run over 200 laps. Ty Gibbs of Joe Gibbs Racing would win the race after taking the lead on the final restart. This was Gibbs' fifth career Xfinity Series win, and his first of the season. To fill out the podium, Noah Gragson of JR Motorsports and Daniel Hemric of Kaulig Racing would finish second and third, respectively.

Background 
Las Vegas Motor Speedway, located in Clark County, Nevada outside the Las Vegas city limits and about 15 miles northeast of the Las Vegas Strip, is a 1,200-acre (490 ha) complex of multiple tracks for motorsports racing. The complex is owned by Speedway Motorsports, Inc., which is headquartered in Charlotte, North Carolina.

Entry list 

 **Withdrew prior to the event.

Practice 
The only 30-minute practice session is scheduled to be held on Friday, March 4, at 3:30 PM PST.

Qualifying 
Qualifying was held on Friday, March 4, at 4:00 PM PST. Since Las Vegas Motor Speedway is an oval track, the qualifying system used is a single-car, single-lap system with only one round. Whoever sets the fastest time in the round wins the pole.

Full qualifying results

Race results 
Stage 1 Laps: 45

Stage 2 Laps: 45

Stage 3 Laps: 110

Standings after the race

Drivers' Championship standings

Note: Only the first 12 positions are included for the driver standings.

References 

2022 NASCAR Xfinity Series
NASCAR races at Las Vegas Motor Speedway
Alsco Uniforms 300 (Las Vegas)
Alsco Uniforms 300 (Las Vegas)